The following is a list of English-speaking population by country, including information on both native speakers and second-language speakers.

List 

  The European Union is a supranational union composed of 27 member states. The total English-speaking population of the European Union and the United Kingdom combined (2012) is 256,876,220 (out of a total population of 500,000,000, i.e. 51%) including 65,478,252 native speakers and 191,397,968 non-native speakers, and would be ranked 2nd if it were included. English native speakers amount to 13% of the whole population of the EU and the UK, while the percentage of people that speak English "well enough in order to be able to have a conversation", either as first (32%), second (11%) or third (3%) foreign language, was 38%.
 When taken from this list and added together, the total number of English speakers in the world adds up to around 1,200,000,000. Likewise, the total number of native English speakers adds up to around 350,000,000. This implies that there are approximately 850,000,000 people who speak English as an additional language.

See also

 EF English Proficiency Index
 English medium education
 English-speaking world
 List of countries where English is an official language
 World Englishes

Non-English speaking populations:
 Arabophone
 Francophone
 Hispanophone
 Iberophone
 Indosphere
 Lusophone
 Persophone
 Russophone
 Sinophone

Notes

References
 WizMantra Online
  Teachingenglish.org.uk
 
 Eurobarometer report – Europeans and their languages, February 2006 (pdf). Only includes EU citizens aged 15 and above.
 Eurobarometer report – Europeans and their languages, June 2012 (pdf). Only includes EU citizens aged 15 and above.
 

English speaking population
English as a global language